Morgandale is an unincorporated community and census-designated place in Trumbull County, Ohio, United States. The population was 1,139 at the 2020 census. It is part of the Youngstown–Warren metropolitan area.

Geography

Demographics

References

Unincorporated communities in Trumbull County, Ohio
Unincorporated communities in Ohio
Census-designated places in Trumbull County, Ohio
Census-designated places in Ohio